RBWH busway station is located in Brisbane, Australia serving the suburb of Herston and Royal Brisbane & Women's Hospital from which its name is an acronym of. It opened on 3 August 2009 when the Northern Busway was extended from Herston.

The station has two platforms which can be accessed via an elevated concourse located below the platforms, while stairs and elevators also give passengers access to ground level just below the concourse.

It is served by 14 routes all operated by Brisbane Transport.

References

External links

[ RBWH station] TransLink

Bus stations in Brisbane
Herston, Queensland
Transport infrastructure completed in 2009